The Gordon Sinclair Award is a Canadian journalism award, presented by the Academy of Canadian Cinema and Television for excellence in broadcast journalism. Originally presented as part of the ACTRA Awards, it was transferred to the new Gemini Awards in 1986. During the ACTRA era, the award was open to both radio and television journalists; when it was taken over by the Academy, it became a television-only award.

In the late 1990s, the award transitioned from a competitive award with a shortlist of nominees, which was presented to honour journalism work within the past year, into a lifetime achievement award whose winner was announced in advance of the annual award ceremony.

Since 2013, it has been presented as part of the Canadian Screen Awards.

The award is named in honour of television and radio commentator Gordon Sinclair.

Winners

ACTRA
1972 - Pierre Berton
1973 - Max Ferguson
1975 - Jack Webster
1976 - Warner Troyer and Adrienne Clarkson
1977 - Judy LaMarsh
1978 - Linden MacIntyre
1979 - Barbara Frum
1980 - Ricki Katz and Susan Millican
1981 - Eric Malling
1982 - Stephen Lewis
1983 - Laurier LaPierre
1984 - Elizabeth Gray
1985 - Eric Malling and Hana Gartner
1986 - Roy Bonisteel

Gemini
1986 - Jim Reed and Eric Malling
1987 - Joe Schlesinger
1988 - no award presented
1989 - Patrick Watson
1990 - Peter Mansbridge
1991 - Pamela Wallin
1992 - Linden MacIntyre
1993 - Craig Oliver
1994 - Linden MacIntyre
1995 - Brian Stewart
1996 - Victor Malarek
1997 - Linden MacIntyre
1998 - Peter Mansbridge
1999 - David Studer
2000 - Ron Haggart
2001 - Bill Cunningham
2002 - Dennis McIntosh
2003 - Brian McKenna
2004 - Neil Docherty
2005 - David Halton
2006 - Hana Gartner
2007 - Tony Burman
2008 - Don Newman
2009 - no award presented
2010 - no award presented
2011 - Lloyd Robertson
2012 - Laurier LaPierre

Canadian Screen
2013 - W5
2014 - Ric Esther Bienstock
2015 - Mark Starowicz
2016 - Simcha Jacobovici
2017 - Karyn Pugliese
2018 - no recipient
2019 - no recipient
2020 - Anton Koschany
2021 - no recipient
2022 - Rassi Nashalik
2023 - Lisa LaFlamme

References

Canadian Screen Award television categories
Canadian journalism awards
ACTRA Awards